Selene Alejandra Delgado Delgado (born 19 June 1996) is a Venezuelan model and beauty pageant titleholder who was crowned Miss Supranational Venezuela 2023. She also represented Miranda at the Miss Venezuela 2021 where she placed as the 4th runner-up. Delgado will represent Venezuela at the Miss Supranational 2023 pageant in Poland.

Pageantry

Miss Venezuela 2021
Delgado began her pageantry career in 2021, after she was selected to represent Miranda at the Miss Venezuela 2021 pageant held at the Estudio 1 de Venevisión in Caracas on October 28, 2021, where she placed as the 4th Runner-up and lost eventually winner Amanda Dudamel of Región Andina.

Miss Supranational Venezuela 2023
Delgado was selected as one of the thirteen candidates in Miss Supranational Venezuela. On June 9, 2022, she was one of the two contestants awarded a crown, being crowned as Miss Supranational Venezuela 2023. Delgado was given the opportunity to represent Venezuela at the Miss Supranational 2023.

References

External links
 

Living people
1996 births
Venezuelan beauty pageant winners
Venezuelan female models
Miss Venezuela winners
People from Guatire
Universidad Santa María (Venezuela) alumni